Trinidad Municipality may refer to:
 Trinidad Municipality, Beni, Bolivia
 Trinidad, Casanare, Colombia

Municipality name disambiguation pages